Ashleigh Woodland (born 9 September 1998) is an Australian rules footballer who plays for Port Adelaide in the AFL Women's competition (AFLW). She previously played for Melbourne for one season before returning home to Adelaide where she has played three seasons for Adelaide.

Woodland enjoyed a breakout season with Adelaide in 2022, winning the 2022 AFLW leading goalkicker award and the 2022 AFLW Premiership with Adelaide.

AFLW career
Woodland was signed by Melbourne as an undrafted free agent following the 2018 AFL Women's draft.

Woodland enjoyed a breakout season with Adelaide in 2022, starting the season with 4 goals in round one against Brisbane and another 4 goals in round two against North Melbourne. In the final minor round game v St Kilda, Woodland kicked two goals to win the 2022 AFLW leading goalkicker award with 19 goals.  Woodland and her team went on to win the 2022 AFLW Premiership over Melbourne.

In March 2023, during the new Priority signing period, Woodland joined Port Adelaide.

References

External links 

1998 births
Living people
Melbourne Football Club (AFLW) players
Australian rules footballers from South Australia
Adelaide Football Club (AFLW) players